Misaki Doi was the defending champion, but lost to Priscilla Hon in the first round.

Heather Watson won the title, defeating Sara Sorribes Tormo in the final, 7–5, 6–4.

Seeds

Draw

Finals

Top half

Bottom half

References

External Links
Main Draw

Odlum Brown Vancouver Open - Singles
Vancouver Open